Hamilton Township is one of twelve townships in Jackson County, Indiana, United States. As of the 2010 census, its population was 1,660 and it contained 675 housing units. It was named for James Hamilton, an early local politician.

History
Bell Ford Post Patented Diagonal "Combination Bridge", Beatty-Trimpe Farm, and Shields' Mill Covered Bridge are listed on the National Register of Historic Places.

Geography
Lakes in this township include Docs Lake. The streams of Buck Branch, Cooley Creek, East Fork White Creek and Indian Creek run through this township.

Unincorporated towns
 Acme
 Bobtown
 Cortland
 Shields
 Surprise

Adjacent townships
 Jackson Township, Bartholomew County (north)
 Wayne Township, Bartholomew County (northeast)
 Redding Township (east)
 Jackson Township (east-southeast)
 Brownstown Township (southwest)
 Pershing Township (west)

Cemeteries
The township contains three cemeteries: Cortland, Robinson and Weddell. There is also an old abandoned cemetery known as Brown Cemetery.

Major highways
  Indiana State Road 258

References
 
 United States Census Bureau cartographic boundary files

External links
 Indiana Township Association
 United Township Association of Indiana

Townships in Jackson County, Indiana
Townships in Indiana